Ascidiidae ("same-sac family") is a family of tunicates in the class Ascidiacea.

Some species contain elevated amounts of vanadium.

There are 4 genera:
 Ascidia
 Ascidiella
 Phallusia
 Psammascidia

See also
 Vanabins

References 

Enterogona
Tunicate families